In enzymology, a cellulose synthase (GDP-forming) is an enzyme that catalyzes the chemical reaction

GDP-glucose + (1,4-beta-D-glucosyl)n  GDP + (1,4-beta-D-glucosyl)n+1

Thus, the two substrates of this enzyme are GDP-glucose and (1,4-beta-D-glucosyl)n, whereas its two products are GDP and (1,4-beta-D-glucosyl)n+1.

This enzyme belongs to the family of glycosyltransferases, specifically the hexosyltransferases.  The systematic name of this enzyme class is GDP-glucose:1,4-beta-D-glucan 4-beta-D-glucosyltransferase. Other names in common use include cellulose synthase (guanosine diphosphate-forming), cellulose synthetase, guanosine diphosphoglucose-1,4-beta-glucan glucosyltransferase, and guanosine diphosphoglucose-cellulose glucosyltransferase.  This enzyme participates in starch and sucrose metabolism.

, no proteins with this activity are known in the UniProt/NiceZYme or the gene ontology database.

References

 
 

EC 2.4.1
Enzymes of unknown structure